"Jump" is the fourth official single taken from Flo Rida's second album R.O.O.T.S. Nelly Furtado makes an appearance on the song with an upbeat hook. Flo-Rida said: "I used a whole different delivery on this one. We're talking about different situations to get people hype in the club. 'Jump!' Whether you're an athlete running in the stadium or you're in the club. Get hype!"

The song was used to promote the Disney film G-Force, and an edited version was added to Radio Disney's playlist.

It's Flo Rida's eighth consecutive Hot 100 entry, and one of his only singles that didn't make it to the Top 30 of the Hot 100 chart.

Chart performance

"Jump" made a brief visit to the Canadian Hot 100 Chart for 3 weeks and The Billboard Hot 100 chart for 1 week. Since the song has not been released as a single or for airplay, the chart performance relied on only digital sales. The single has re-entered at number 76 on Billboard Hot 100, due to G-Force taking the #1 spot its opening week.  So far the single has peaked at #54, making this the first single from Flo Rida not to crack Top 20 in the US. The song made appearance on the American Top 40 for one week. It debuted at #40, and it fell outside the top 40 on the next week. The song has been most successful in Australia where it has so far peaked at #18, making it his 5th song to reach the top 20 there.

Music video 
The music video was filmed in May by Chris Robinson.  The video premiered worldwide on July 11, 2009, featuring clips from G-Force.  The video premiered on BET's 106 & Park on August 13, 2009.  Nelly Furtado does not appear in the video.  Mike Epps makes a cameo appearance in the video. The TV Version does not have the G-Force Clips, instead, people are jumping in a hall and Furtado is animated.

Track listing 
Japanese digital single
"Jump" (Let's Go Ichiro Remix)

Charts

Certifications

Release history

References

2009 songs
Flo Rida songs
Music videos directed by Chris Robinson (director)
Nelly Furtado songs
Songs written by Nelly Furtado
Songs written by Mike Caren
Songs written by Ester Dean